Rotherham Town F.C. was an English football club from Rotherham, Yorkshire. They merged with rivals Rotherham County in 1925 to form Rotherham United.

History
In 1899, Rotherham Casuals and Rotherham Grammar School combined to form Rotherham F.C. On becoming a limited company in 1904 a new name of Rotherham Athletic was adopted, and a year later they changed their name again, to Rotherham Town (which had been the name of a  former Football League club from the town).

In 1903 the new club joined the Midland League, where they remained until 1925, when they merged with their Third Division North neighbours Rotherham County to form Rotherham United.

Notable former players
:Category:Rotherham Town F.C. (1899) players

League and cup history

Honours

League
Midland League
Runners-up: 1908–09, 1911–12
Sheffield Association League
Champions: 1902–03
Sheffield Association League Division 2
Champions: 1899-1900

Cup
Sheffield & Hallamshire Senior Cup
Winners: 1919–20, 1924–25
Rotherham Charity Cup
Winners: 1899-1900

Records
Best FA Cup performance: 1st Round, 1907–08

References

Association football clubs established in 1899
Association football clubs disestablished in 1925
Defunct football clubs in England
Defunct football clubs in South Yorkshire
Sport in Rotherham
1899 establishments in England
1925 disestablishments in England
Sheffield Association League
Midland Football League (1889)